Films produced in Spain in the 1970s ordered by year of release on separate pages:

List of films by year
Spanish films of 1970
Spanish films of 1971
Spanish films of 1972
Spanish films of 1973
Spanish films of 1974
Spanish films of 1975
Spanish films of 1976
Spanish films of 1977
Spanish films of 1978
Spanish films of 1979

External links
 Spanish film at the Internet Movie Database

Spanish
Films